A menstruation hut is a place of seclusion or isolation used by certain cultures with strong menstrual taboos. The same or a similar structure may be used for childbirth and postpartum confinement, based on beliefs around ritual impurity. These huts are usually built near the family home, have small doors, and are often dilapidated, with poor sanitation and ventilation, and no windows. The Nepali version, the Chhaupadi, is probably the best-known example, but cultural attitudes towards menstruation around the world mean that these huts exist, or existed until recently, in other places as well. The use of menstrual huts continues to be a cause of death, from exposure, dehydration, snake bite, smoke inhalation, and so on.  The use of these huts is illegal in some places.

Cultures

Use in Ethiopia among Jewish women 

Menstruation huts in Ethiopia hold a special place, as Jewish women try to continue this custom. In Ethiopia, they refer to these menstruation huts as margam gojos. Within the margam gojos, there are few utensils, some pieces of equipment, and some basic furniture. The stones are placed in a circular shape around the menstruation hut at a radius of one and a half meters; these stones help distinguish between perceived impure and pure spaces. Menstruation blood is thought to be impure as Jewish Ethiopians believe the failure to give birth is manifested in the blood. If anyone were to come into contact with the woman during their menstruation, they would too have to stay in the hut. Therefore to avoid contact, the family of the women in the margam gojos will leave food outside the door. If her blood is to touch food or drink, it would be thrown out. This is why women wear leather belts under their shirts with fabric tied to them to prevent any dripping. The same idea is conveyed in that a Jewish woman cannot go to or cross rivers during menstruation lest she drip and contaminate the river. Once a woman has finished menstruating, another woman will watch her immerge in the river. There, the woman who has just finished menstruating will wash herself and the clothes she wore in the margam gojo. After she and her clothes are clean, she will then change into pure clothes that have been retrieved from her home. The only time that a Jewish woman ceases going to the margam gojo is when she starts menopause, as it puts an end to the impurity.

In Judaism, when a woman becomes niddah (cast out during menstruation), she may remain in a niddah hut for some of the time. These huts are absent in Israel, but exist in the Ethiopian highlands. The women must stay in the hut, usually located on the margins of the village, for seven days. Women there report negative as well as positive views on the practice. Some describe fear, cold, and lack of food, while others enjoy the social interaction, relaxation, and rest. While in these huts, the women can not cook, apart from coffee and the roasting of grain. Others may bring food to them, but while doing so they take care in avoiding physical contact.

Chhaupadi in Nepal 

According to the tradition of chhaupadi, Hindu women in western Nepal reside in a small hut, called a Chhau Goth, for 5 days during menstruation. However, the tradition requires those menstruating for the first time to stay in the hut for at least 14 days. In some communities, these huts may also be used by pregnant women to deliver babies. The huts may be made of mud and stones and may have roofs made of grass. Normally, they do not have windows, and the women sleep on straw on the floor covering themselves with a thin blanket. In a Nepali survey around 2017, one district with around 49,000 households had over 500 of these huts. Although the practice of using menstruation huts was made illegal in 2005 by Nepal's supreme court, the first arrest under this legislation did not take place until 2019.

India 
In many Indian states, the practice of banishing women and girls is common. It is mostly prevalent among the Gonds which are the largest indigenous group in Central India and hail from the states of Maharashtra, Chhattisgarh, Andhra Pradesh and Orissa as well as Madiya ethnic groups.These shacks, known locally as "kurma ghar" or "gaokar," lack basic amenities like proper beds, clean water and functional washrooms. Since menstruating women are not permitted to cook, Gaokors lack a kitchen. Those staying inside rely on family members to bring them food and other supplies. The accountability of maintaining such huts lies on no one since they are considered as public property. These shacks are usually located on the outskirts of the village or near a forest. The unsanitary conditions coupled with unhygienic menstrual practices — many women use strips made from mahua leaves covered with paddy chaff as pads, often lead to infections, illnesses, and sometimes even death. The decrepit shacks provide little protection against wild creatures. 

According to a representative of from a local NGO Sparsh, at least eight women have passed away in Gadchiroli alone since 2011 as a result of this forced seclusion. Some have died due to pneumonia, while others were bitten by snakes. Jayanti Baburao Gawade, a 47-year-old was made to go to the menstrual hut while she had fever and high blood pressure and was discovered dead the next morning by her family in Ettapalli, Gadchiroli district, in November 2017. During cyclone Gaja in Thanjavur district in Tamil Nadu, a 14-year-old girl who was compelled to stay in a hut outside her home because she was menstruating, was killed when a coconut tree fell on it.

In 2015, India's National Human Rights Commission called the practice as "a violation of human rights" and ordered Maharashtra to take action to end the practice. Religion and tradition are often cited as main reasons for justifying restrictions. It is believed by the people that the tradition could not be changed because "it's been decreed by our gods" and if they defied tradition, they would face the wrath of gods and invite illness and death in the family. 

A lot of girls are forced to remain absent from school due to this practice. An estimated 23% of girls in India drop out of school when they start menstruating. This custom frequently prevents girls from taking their exams while she is menstruating. It denotes that only a few girls from regions where this practice is prevalent continue their education past matriculation.

To challenge the stigma and taboos around menstruation, various social media campaigns have been launched. The #periodforchange campaign, started by the Kachra Project, encouraged discussion on the topic. #Happytobleed is another counter-campaign to combat the sexism that women experience as a result of taboos associated with menstruation. It recognizes menstruation as a normal occurrence which doesn't need curtains to hide behind.

Others 
In Yap (part of Micronesia), after giving birth, women and their newborn babies spend time in a menstruation hut while the father has a holiday.

The Yurok women of California lived in menstruation huts built near the main house.

The Páez people of the southwestern highlands of Colombia were known to use menstruation huts.

See also
Menarche
Culture and menstruation
Seclusion of girls at puberty
 The Red Tent (Diamant novel)

References

External links
 

Feminism and health
Menstrual cycle
Huts
Sex segregation
Pseudoscience